The 37th annual Berlin International Film Festival was held from 20 February to 3 March 1987. The Golden Bear was awarded to the Soviet Union film Tema directed by Gleb Panfilov. The retrospective was in honour of Armenian-American film and theatre director Rouben Mamoulian. The homage was dedicated to French couple Jean-Louis Barrault, actor and director, and Madeleine Renaud, actress. It was titled Renaud-Barrault au cinéma.

Jury

The following people were announced as being on the jury for the festival:
 Klaus Maria Brandauer, actor (Austria) - Jury President
 Juliet Berto, actress and director (France)
 Kathleen Carroll, film critic (United States)
 Callisto Cosulich, film critic (Italy)
 Victor Dyomin, actor and screenwriter (Soviet Union)
 Reinhard Hauff, director and screenwriter (Germany)
 Edmund Luft, playwright, film critic and film historian (West Germany)
 Jiří Menzel, actor, director and screenwriter (Czechoslovakia)
 Dan Pița, director and screenwriter (Romania)
 Paul Schrader, director, screenwriter and film critic (United States)
 Antonio Skármeta, writer (Chile)

Films in competition
The following films were in competition for the Golden Bear:

Out of competition
 Прощание Proshchanie, directed by Elem Klimov (Soviet Union)
 The Color of Money, directed by Martin Scorsese (USA)
 Kronika wypadków miłosnych, directed by Andrzej Wajda (Poland)
 , directed by Hark Bohm (West Germany)
 Light of Day, directed by Paul Schrader (USA)
 Ein Treffen mit Rimbaud, directed by Ernst-August Zurborn (West Germany)
 True Stories, directed by David Byrne (USA)

Key
{| class="wikitable" width="550" colspan="1"
| style="background:#FFDEAD;" align="center"| †
|Winner of the main award for best film in its section
|}

Retrospective
The following films were shown in the retrospective dedicated to Rouben Mamoulian:

The following films were shown in the homage titled "Renaud-Barrault au cinéma" dedicated to Jean-Louis Barrault and Madeleine Renaud:

Awards

The following prizes were awarded by the Jury:
 Golden Bear: Tema by Gleb Panfilov
 Silver Bear – Special Jury Prize: Umi to dokuyaku by Kei Kumai
 Silver Bear for Best Director: Oliver Stone for Platoon
 Silver Bear for Best Actress: Ana Beatriz Nogueira for Vera
 Silver Bear for Best Actor: Gian Maria Volonté for Il caso Moro
 Silver Bear for an outstanding single achievement: 
 Márta Mészáros for Napló szerelmeimnek
 Fernando Trueba for El Año de las Luces
 Silver Bear for an outstanding artistic contribution: Children of a Lesser God
 Alfred-Bauer Prize: Mauvais Sang
FIPRESCI Award
Tema by Gleb Panfilov

References

External links
37th Berlin International Film Festival 1987
1987 Berlin International Film Festival
Berlin International Film Festival:1987 at Internet Movie Database

37
1987 film festivals
1987 in West Germany
1980s in West Berlin
Berlin